Obergailbach (Lorraine Franconian: Owergäälbach) is a commune in the Moselle department of the Grand Est administrative region in north-eastern France.

The village belongs to the Pays de Bitche and to the Northern Vosges Regional Nature Park. Located on the border with Germany, it is adjacent to the German village of Niedergailbach.

Population

See also
 Communes of the Moselle department

References

External links

 Photo Saint-Maurice, Obergailbach
 Info sur Saint-Maurice

Communes of Moselle (department)